Lyman Johnson is the name of:
Lyman E. Johnson (1811–1859), American leader in the Latter Day Saint movement
Lyman T. Johnson (1906–1997), American educator and influential leader of racial desegregation in Kentucky

See also
 Lyman (disambiguation)